Gering is a surname. Notable people with the surname include:

Galen Gering (born 1971), American actor
Giles Gering, an artist at the court of King Henry VIII of England
Jurij Gering, politician in the Holy Roman Empire, mayor of Ljubljana in 1524
Rudi Gering (1917 – 1998 or 1999), German ski jumper
Ulrich Gering (died 1510), one of three partners who established the first printing press in France

German-language surnames
Surnames from given names